Zsuzsanna 'Zsuzsa' Fantusz (married name Javor) was a female Hungarian international table tennis player.

Table tennis career
She won double bronze at the 1953 World Table Tennis Championships in the women's doubles with Edit Sági and the women's team.

Personal life
She emigrated to Australia after 1956 and was inaugurated into the Australian Hall of Fame.

See also
 List of table tennis players
 List of World Table Tennis Championships medalists

References

1933 births
Hungarian female table tennis players
Hungarian emigrants to Australia
Table tennis players from Budapest
Living people
World Table Tennis Championships medalists